Propachyrucos is an extinct genus of hegetotheriid notoungulate. It lived from the Late Oligocene to the Early Miocene, in what is today South America.

Description

Its body was slender, with a very short tail and strong forelegs, although much shorter than the hind legs, equipped with long metatarsals.

The skull had a complete dentition, but the second and third incisors, as well as the canines and the first lower premolars, were vestigial. The first upper incisors were very large, and showed a considerable development. The molars had two internal folds separated by a further deep fold, like the Interatheriidae ; dental cementum was present, but to a lesser extent than in Interatherium. The lower teeth were flat on the outside and bilobed on the inside.

The tibia and fibula were not fused, and the forearm and lower leg bones were respectively shorter than the humerus and femur, but the hind legs were much longer than the forelegs. The second and third fingers of the hand were of similar length, and the fourth was smaller ; the fifth finger was small, even smaller than in its relative Pachyrukhos. The hand seems more specialized than in Pachyrukhos, and shares similarities with that of Paedotherium. The metatarsals were elongated, especially the third.

Classification

Propachyrucos was first described in 1897 by Florentino Ameghino, based on a right mandible fragment found in Oligocene terrains of the Sarmiento Formation in Argentina, initially believed by Ameghino to have been Cretaceous. The type species is Propachyrucos smithwoodwardi, but other species have been attributed to the genus, such as P. aequilatus, P. robustus, and P. ameghinorum, the latter species, described in 1945 by George Gaylord Simpson from fossils found in the Chubut Province, is known from a remarkably complete skeleton, permitting to reconstruct the animal appearance with high precision. However, recent researches tend to indicate that all the other species of Propachyrucos are in fact synonymous with the type species.

Propachyrucos was a hegetothere, a group of notoungulates that evolved in isolation on the South American continent, giving rise to forms resembling hares and rabbits. Propachyrucos was a member of Pachyrukhinae, a subfamily of hegetotheres particularly similar to modern Lagomorphs.

Paleoecology

Propachyrucos and its relatives were animals well suited to running and jumping. Body proportions similar to those of Propachyrucos can also be found in the Cainotheriidae, a group of Artiodactyls from the Oligocene-Miocene of Europe.

References and bibliography 

F. Ameghino. 1897. Mamiferos Cretaceos de la Argentina. Segunda contribucion al conocimiento de la fauna mastologica de las capas con restos de Pyrotherium. Boletin Instituto Geografico Argentino 18:406-521
S. Roth. 1898. Reconocimiento de la Region Andina de la República Argentina. Apuntes sobre la Geología y la Paleontología de los Territorios del Río Negro y Neuquén (Diciembre de 1895 á Junio de 1896) [Reconnaissance of the Andean Region of the Argentine Republic. Notes on the Geology and Paleontology of the Territories of the Río Negro and Neuquén (December 1895 to June 1896)] 1-56
F. Ameghino. 1901. Notices préliminaires sur des ongulés nouveaux des terrains crétacés de Patagonie [Preliminary notes on new ungulates from the Cretaceous terrains of Patagonia]. Boletin de la Academia Nacional de Ciencias de Córdoba 16:349-429
G. G. Simpson. 1945. A Deseado Hegetothere from Patagonia. American Journal of Science 243(10):550-564
E. Cerdeño and M. Reguero. 2015. The Hegetotheriidae (Mammalia, Notoungulata) assemblage from the late Oligocene of Mendoza, central-western Argentina. Journal of Vertebrate Paleontology 35(2):e907173:1-14

Typotheres
Oligocene mammals of South America
Miocene mammals of South America
Paleogene Argentina
Neogene Argentina
Fossils of Argentina
Fossil taxa described in 1897
Taxa named by Florentino Ameghino
Prehistoric placental genera
Golfo San Jorge Basin
Sarmiento Formation